The Minnesota Army National Guard, along with the Minnesota Air National Guard, is an element of the Minnesota National Guard. The Constitution of the United States specifically charges the National Guard with dual federal and state missions. In fact, the National Guard is the only United States military force empowered to function in a state status. Those functions range from limited actions during non-emergency situations to full scale law enforcement of martial law when local law enforcement officials can no longer maintain civil control.
The National Guard may be called into federal service in response to a call by the President or Congress.

The Minnesota Army National Guard is composed of approximately 11,000 Soldiers, spread out in 65 training and community centers across the state.

When National Guard troops are called to federal service, the President serves as Commander-in-Chief. The federal mission assigned to the National Guard is: "To provide properly trained and equipped units for prompt mobilization for war, National emergency or as otherwise needed."

The Governor may call individuals or units of the Minnesota National Guard into state service during emergencies or to assist in special situations which lend themselves to use of the National Guard. The state mission assigned to the National Guard is:
"To provide trained and disciplined forces for domestic emergencies or as otherwise provided by state law."

The State Defense force is a military entity authorized by both the State Code of Minnesota and executive order. The State Defense Force (SDF) is the state’s authorized militia and assumes the state mission of the Minnesota National Guard in the event the Guard is mobilized. The SDF is composed of retired active and reserve military personnel and selected professional persons who volunteer their time and talents in further service to their state.

The Minnesota Army National Guard is a component of the United States Army and the United States National Guard.  Nationwide, the Army National Guard comprises approximately one half of the US Army's available combat forces and approximately one third of its support organization.  National coordination of various state National Guard units are maintained through the National Guard Bureau.

Minnesota Army National Guard units are trained and equipped as part of the United States Army.  The same ranks and insignia are used and National Guardsmen are eligible to receive all United States military awards. The Minnesota Guard also bestows a number of state awards for local services rendered in or to the state of Minnesota.

Units and Formations
See list of Minnesota National Guard units.

Duties
National Guard units can be mobilized at any time by presidential order to supplement regular armed forces, and upon declaration of a state of emergency by the governor of the state in which they serve. Unlike Army Reserve members, National Guard members cannot be mobilized individually (except through voluntary transfers and Temporary DutY Assignments TDY), but only as part of their respective units. However, there has been a significant number of individual activations to support military operations (2001-?); the legality of this policy is a major issue within the National Guard.

Active Duty Callups
For much of the final decades of the twentieth century, National Guard personnel typically served "One weekend a month, two weeks a year", with a portion working for the Guard in a full-time capacity.  The current forces formation plans of the US Army call for the typical National Guard unit (or National Guardsman) to serve one year of active duty for every three years of service.  More specifically, current Department of Defense policy is that no Guardsman will be involuntarily activated for a total of more than 24 months (cumulative) in one six year enlistment period (this policy changed on 1 August 2007, the new policy states that soldiers will be given 24 months between deployments of no more than 24 months, individual states have differing policies).

History
The Minnesota Army National Guard was originally formed in 1856.  The Militia Act of 1903 organized the various state militias into the present National Guard system.

Two cavalry regiments with long ties to the Minnesota Army National Guard are the 94th Cavalry Regiment and the 194th Cavalry Regiment.

The origins of the 94th Cavalry lie with the 1st Battalion, 136th Infantry Regiment (United States). On 22 February 1959 the 1-136 Infantry was converted and redesignated the 2nd Reconnaissance Squadron, 194th Armor (47th Infantry Division (United States)). Became 2nd Bn, 194th Armor in 1963, remaining with the 47th Infantry Division. The battalion was reorganized and redesignated on 1 Feb 68 as the 194th Armor, a CARS regiment, consisting of the 2nd Battalion, still with the 47th ID; reorganised and redesignated 8 Jan 72 as the 94th Armor, a CARS regiment, consisting of the 1st Battalion, an element of the 47th Infantry Division. Transferred with HQ at Duluth from CARS to USARS 1 June 1989. 1-94 Armor transferred to 34th Infantry Division on 1 September 1991. Reorganized, redesignated, and consolidated with all details remaining the same on 1 September 1992.

Other serving and historic regiments of the Minnesota Army National Guard include:
  135th Infantry Regiment
  125th Field Artillery Regiment
  151st Field Artillery Regiment
  175th Field Artillery Regiment
  215th Coast Artillery Regiment

See also
 Minnesota Naval Militia
 Minnesota State Guard
 Minnesota Wing Civil Air Patrol

References

External links

Official website
Bibliography of Minnesota Army National Guard History compiled by the United States Army Center of Military History
GlobalSecurity.org Minnesota Army National Guard, accessed 23 Nov 2006
Camp Cody - Minnesota National Guard WW1
National Guard Association of Minnesota
Beyond the Yellow Ribbon Campaign

United States Army National Guard by state
Minnesota National Guard